Paul Kohner (May 29, 1902 – March 16, 1988) was an Austrian-American talent agent and producer who managed the careers of many stars and others—like Ingrid Bergman, Maurice Chevalier, Marlene Dietrich, Greta Garbo, John Huston, Liv Ullmann and Billy Wilder—of the golden age of Hollywood, especially those who came from Europe before World War II. He was married to the Mexican-American actress, Lupita Tovar. His brother was  Frederick Kohner, a novelist and screenwriter, his daughter was the actress Susan Kohner. His grandsons are the filmmakers Chris Weitz and Paul Weitz.

Early life 
Kohner was born to a Jewish family  in Teplitz-Schönau, Austria-Hungary (now Teplice, Czech Republic). His father was Julius "Kino" Kohner, who managed the local movie theater and published a film industry newspaper, and his mother was Helene Kohner (née Beamt). He had two brothers, Friedrich "Frederick" Kohner, a film and TV writer who created the character Gidget (based on his daughter, Kathy), and Walter Kohner, a Hollywood agent whose wife, Hanna Kohner, in May 1953, was the first non-celebrity featured on the television show, This Is Your Life, where she was the first Holocaust survivor to talk about her experiences in concentration and death camps on television.

Career

Producer 
As a young man, Kohner worked as a news reporter at his father's magazine Internationale Filmschau, which focused on the film industry. He met Carl Laemmle during an interview in Karlovy Vary in 1920. Laemmle was impressed by 18-year old Kohner and offered him a job. Kohner decided to move to the United States. Kohner started out as an office errand boy at Laemmle's company, Universal Pictures, in New York. There, he became friends with another young émigré working for Universal, William Wyler. He moved to Hollywood and worked his way up the studio system, working in positions at Universal like unit production supervisor as well as casting director. Because of his knowledge of film production and background in Germany, Kohner went on to head Universal Pictures' European production offices located in Berlin, Germany in the late 1920s. Kohner moved back to the United States in the early 1930s. He worked as a producer, responsible for shepherding many Universal Pictures films like the Lon Chaney version of The Hunchback of Notre Dame, William Wyler's A House Divided that starred Walter Huston, among others.

Kohner produced many alternate language versions of films that were often shot simultaneously with their English-language counterparts, sometimes shooting at night on the same sets, but with Spanish casts of actors and different costumes. Kohner's wife, Lupita Tovar, starred in some of these Spanish language film versions, including  Drácula (1931).

Talent agent 
In 1938, Kohner founded the Paul Kohner Talent Agency and managed the careers of Marlene Dietrich, Greta Garbo, Dolores del Río, Maurice Chevalier, Billy Wilder, Henry Fonda, David Niven, Erich von Stroheim, Ingmar Bergman, Lana Turner, Liv Ullmann, and others. Many of his clients had left war-torn Europe, fleeing Nazi Germany. John Huston was Kohner's client for over forty years. The company was in business from 1935 to 1988.

Paul Kohner's office was on the Sunset Strip in a building owned by a partner of his, Stanley Bergerman, who was Carl Laemmle's son-in-law. The facade of the building, located across the street from the now-defunct restaurant, the Cock and Bull, can be glimpsed in the film The Strip (1951) starring Mickey Rooney.

In 1976, Kohner partnered with agent Michael Levy to form the Paul Kohner-Michael Levy Agency.

European Film Fund 

In 1938, Kohner co-founded the European Film Fund with Ernst Lubitsch, and Universal Pictures studio head, Carl Laemmle. From 1938 to 1948, during World War II, the Fund worked in an effort to provide assistance to émigrés trying to relocate to America.

Personal life 
From 1923 to 1927, Kohner was in a relationship with Mary Philbin. They became engaged in 1926, but never married due to the disapproval of Philbin's parents. It was rumored they were going to marry in June 1929, but it did not happen. When Kohner died, he still had love letters Philbin had written to him in his possession. She had also kept his.
Kohner and actress Lupita Tovar were married in Czechoslovakia on October 30, 1932, at Kohner's parents' home by a rabbi.

In 1936, the couple had a daughter, Susan Kohner, a film and television actress, and, in 1939, a son, Paul Julius "Pancho" Kohner Jr., later a director and producer. The family lived for many years in the Bel Air neighborhood of Los Angeles, California, near filmmaker Alexander Korda. Their grandsons, Chris and Paul Weitz, are successful film directors. Kohner spoke six languages.

In 1988, Kohner died of a heart attack in Los Angeles, California.

His wife, the Mexican-born film actress Lupita Tovar, died at age 106 on November 12, 2016.

Honors 
 April 1997: "Hollywood's Gentleman Agent: Paul Kohner." Exhibit curated by Goethe-Institut Los Angeles and Stifting Deutsche Kinemathek.

Filmography 
 1927: Surrender (Universal) – Supervisor
 1927: The Cat and the Canary (Universal) – Supervising producer (uncredited)
 1927: Love Me and the World Is Mine (Universal) (based on the book The Affairs of Hannerl) – Supervising producer; Writer, scenario
 1927: A Man's Past (Universal) – Supervising producer (uncredited); Writer, adaptation
 1928: The Man Who Laughs (Universal) – Production supervisor
 1929: The Brandenburg Arch (Deutsche Universal-Film) – Producer
 1929: Rustle of Spring German: Frühlingsrauschen (Deutsche Universal-Film) – Producer
 1929: White Hell of Pitz Palu (Universal) (1930 sound film version in English, released by Universal internationally) – Associate producer
 1929: Die seltsame Vergangenheit der Thea Carter (English title: The Unusual Past of Thea Carter) (Deutsche Universal-Film) – producer
 1930: Ludwig der Zweite, König von Bayern (Deutsche Universal-Film) (English title: Ludwig II, King of Bavaria) – Producer
 1930: La Voluntad del Muerto (Universal) (Spanish language version of The Cat Creeps) – Producer
 1930: Oriente es Occidente (Universal) (Spanish language version of East Is West) – Producer
 1931: Don Juan Diplomático (Universal) (Spanish language version of the English and French films, The Boudoir Diplomat and Boudoir Diplomatique) – Production supervisor 
 1931: Liebe auf Befehl (Universal) (German language version of the English and French films, The Boudoir Diplomat  and Boudoir Diplomatique) – Production manager
 1931: Resurrección (Mexican) (Spanish language version of A Woman's Resurrection) – Production supervisor
 1931: El Tenorio del Harem (Universal) (Spanish language version of Arabian Knights) – Production supervisor
 1931: Drácula (Universal) (Spanish language version of Dracula) – Associate producer
 1931: East of Borneo (Universal) – Associate producer
 1931: A House Divided (Universal) – Associate producer
 1932: Doomed Battalion (Universal) – Associate producer
 1932: Der Rebell (Deutsche Universal-Film) (German language version of The Rebel) – Producer
 1933: The Rebel (Deutsche Universal-Film) – Producer 
 1933: S.O.S. Eisberg (Deutsche Universal-Film) (German language version of S.O.S. Iceberg) – Associate producer
 1933: S.O.S. Iceberg (Universal Pictures) – Associate producer
 1934: Der Verlorene Sohn (Deutsche Universal-Film) (English title: The Prodigal Son) – Producer    
 1935: Alas sobre El Chaco (Universal) (Spanish language version of Storm Over the Andes) – Producer
 1935: East of Java (Universal) – Producer
 1936: Next Time We Love (Universal) – Producer 
 1978: Erich von Stroheim – Der Mann mit dem bösen Blick (TV movie) – Participation
 1986: Fast ein Jahrhundert – Luis Trenker – Participation
 1989: Wer war Arnold Fanck? – Participation

See also 
 European Film Fund
 Lupita Tovar
 Frederick Kohner
 Susan Kohner
 John Weitz
 Paul Weitz
 Chris Weitz

References

Further reading 
 Kohner, Frederick. Der Zauberer vom Sunset Boulevard: ein Leben zwischen Film und Wirklichkeit. München, Zürich: Droemer-Knaur, 1974.  —Original publication in German
 Kohner, Paul. "Paul Kohner Interview: Interview with agent and studio executive Paul Kohner." Hollywood (Television Program). Unedited Footage. Record date: October 7, 1976. 
 Kohner, Frederick. The Magician of Sunset Boulevard: The Improbable Life of Paul Kohner, Hollywood Agent. Palos Verdes, CA: Morgan Press, 1977.  
 Asper, Helmut G. Filmexilanten im Universal Studio: 1933–1960. Berlin: Bertz + Fischer, 2005.  
 Kohner, Paul, and Heike Klapdor. Ich bin ein unheilbarer Europäer: Briefe aus dem Exil. Berlin: Aufbau, 2007. Heike Klapdor im Auftrag der Deutschen Kinemathek – Museum für Film und Fernsehen.

External links 
 
 Paul Kohner at filmportal.de
 Paul Kohner Agency records at the Margaret Herrick Library, Academy of Motion Picture Arts and Sciences
 Paul Kohner Agency at Künste im Exil
 

1902 births
1988 deaths
American film producers
American people of Austrian-Jewish descent
Austrian emigrants to the United States
Austrian Jews
Burials at Hillside Memorial Park Cemetery
Jewish American male actors
People from Teplice
20th-century American businesspeople
Kohner family
20th-century American Jews